Grumbla (meaning the cromlech) is a hamlet in the parish of Sancreed, Cornwall, England, UK.

Toponymy
Recorded as Gromleigh in 1504, meaning cromlech or prehistoric tomb. Referred to as Grumbler in an advertisement on the front page of The Cornishman in 1880.

Geography
The hamlet of Grumbla along with Higher Grumbla, Lower Grumbla and Grumbla Common is a small area within the parish of Sancreed, to the west of Sancreed Beacon. Grumbla lies within the Cornwall Area of Outstanding Natural Beauty.

History
It consists of a circular earth bank lined with big stones, but its identification is uncertain and it could be the remains of a hut circle.

The leasehold tenement of ″Little Grumbler″ was put up for sale at the Bird-in-Hand Inn, Sancreed Churchtown on Friday, 14 May 1880. The tenement consisted of a dwellinghouse and approximately 6 acres 2 roods, 32 poles (about 2.5 ha) of arable and pasture land. It had previously been under an indenture of lease for an absolute term of 60 years commencing on 24 June 1845 and the yearly rent was £4 per annum. Captain T Trahair of St Just purchased the property for £1 more than the reserve price of £160.

References

Hamlets in Cornwall
Penwith